The Palazzetto dello Sport (literally "Small Sport Palace"), also less commonly known as the PalaTiziano or PalaFlaminio, is an indoor arena that is located in Piazza Apollodoro, in Rome, Italy. It has a 3,500 seating capacity for basketball games.

History
The venue was constructed along with the 11,500-seat Palazzo dello Sport, for the 1960 Summer Olympics, and it was inaugurated in 1957. It was designed by architect Annibale Vitellozzi its reinforced thin-shell concrete dome was engineered by Pier Luigi Nervi under the direction of Engineer Giacomo Maccagno. During the Olympics, the arena hosted the basketball events, among other sports. Since then it has also been used for volleyball matches and other events.

Home of Virtus Roma
At various times over the years, the arena has been home to the Italian professional basketball team, Virtus Roma. The team played there from its foundation, until the early 1980s, and also for a period of several years at the start of the current millennium, when its regular home venue at the Palazzo dello Sport was being renovated. The team moved back to the arena in 2011, as the Palazzo dello Sport (since renamed PalaLottomatica), had high management costs and Virtus Roma was out of EuroLeague competition at the time. The club moved back to the PalaLottomatica in 2018.

Design

The facility incorporates a first-aid center, four groups of dressing rooms, along with an officials dressing room, a medical sports centre, a management office, a press room with 12 telephone booths, two store rooms, and basement-located heating and air-conditioning equipment. Seating could be configured for 3,500 basketball spectators and up to 5,600 for boxing or wrestling spectators.

The arena is constructed with a ribbed concrete shell dome, that is 61 meters in diameter, and is constructed of 1,620 prefabricated concrete pieces, which are braced by concrete flying buttresses. Much of the structure was prefabricated, so that the dome was erected in 40 days.

See also
Norfolk Scope, also by Nervi

References

External links

Basketball venues in Italy
Concrete shell structures
Indoor arenas in Italy
Modernist architecture in Italy
Olympic basketball venues
Olympic weightlifting venues
Rome Q. II Parioli
Sports venues in Rome
Venues of the 1960 Summer Olympics
Volleyball venues in Italy
Pier Luigi Nervi buildings